Shahrak-e Eslamabad may refer to:
 Shahrak-e Eslamabad, Khuzestan
 Shahrak-e Eslamabad, Mazandaran
 Shahrak-e Eslamabad, Sistan and Baluchestan

See also
 Eslamabad (disambiguation)